This is a list of Douglas motorcycles please add to it or update where you can:

See also
List of AMC motorcycles
List of Ariel motorcycles
List of BSA motorcycles
List of Norton motorcycles
List of Triumph motorcycles
List of Royal Enfield motorcycles
List of Velocette motorcycles
List of Vincent motorcycles

External links

Douglas
Douglas